Kabir Bin Anwar (born 4 January 1964) is a retired Bangladeshi civil servant. He was the 23rd Cabinet Secretary of Bangladesh Government, serving for a short period of time from 15 December 2022 until he went to post-retirement vacation 3 January 2023. Prior to that, he was Senior Secretary of the Ministry of Water Resources. Anwar is the chairperson of the Board of Directors of Centre for Environmental and Geographic Information Services. He is the President of Bangladesh Administrative Service Association. He is the chairperson of non-profit Issabela foundation, named after his mother. He was appointed as a co-chairman of the Awami League’s Election Administration Committee on 05 January 2023.

Early life 
Anwar was born on 1 January 1964 in Sirajganj District, East Pakistan, Pakistan. Anwar's mother was Syeda Issabela, a notable writer. He finished his schooling at Dhaka Residential Model College. He completed his LLB and Masters in political science from the University of Dhaka.

Career 
Anwar joined Bangladesh Civil Service in 1985 as an administration cadre.

Anwar had served as the First Secretary at the Embassy of Bangladesh in The Hague, The Netherlands. In 2015 and 2016, Kabir was Project Director of a2i Programme. In 2015, he received an award from World Summit on the Information Society for the project in May 2015. He had been the Director General of Administration at the Prime Minister's Office.

On 22 March 2018, Anwar was appointed the Secretary of Ministry of Water Resources and the chairperson of the Board of Directors of Centre for Environmental and Geographic Information Services from the Prime Minister's Office. He was promoted to the rank of Senior Secretary on 22 June 2020. He is the President of the National Committee for the Development of Bangladesh Scouts and was awarded the "Silver Tiger" medal by the scouts on 6 December 2020.

Anwar was appointed President of Bangladesh Administrative Service Association at the annual general meeting and replaced Helal Uddin Ahmed. He spoke at the Climate Adaptation Summit in 2021. He is the chairperson of Institute of Water Modelling. On 17 March 2021, he met the Water resource secretary of India, Shri Pankaj Kumar, to discuss water resource issues between the two countries. He provided food to people in Sirajganj District on 24 April 2021 during the COVID-19 pandemic in Bangladesh. On 25 June 2021, he signed a performance agreement with AKM Wahed Uddin Chowdhury, Director General of Bangladesh Water Development Board. He called for the arrest of Serniabat Sadiq Abdullah, mayor of Barishal and cousin of Prime Minister Sheikh Hasina, following an altercation between the Upazila Nirbahi Officer Munibur Rahman and employees of the city corporation in August. He has been appointed as the 23rd cabinet secretary on effect from 15 December, 2022 and retired just after 19 days. He was appointed as a co-chairman of the Awami League’s Election Administration Committee on 05 January 2023.

References 

Living people
University of Dhaka alumni
Dhaka Residential Model College alumni
1964 births
People from Sirajganj District
Bangladeshi civil servants
Secretaries of the Cabinet (Bangladesh)